Panorama Tower is a mixed-use 85-story skyscraper in Miami, Florida, United States. Located in the Brickell district of Downtown Miami, it is the tallest building in Miami, and the tallest building in Florida.

Construction on Panorama Tower was put on hold during the 2007-2009 Great Recession. The project was revived in 2012 when owner Tibor Hollo hired Moshe Cosicher, AIA Architect, to redesign the project. In 2013, the project was revised; the  tower includes residential, hotel, retail, and office space. Panorama Tower took overtook the Four Seasons Hotel Miami as tallest when it topped out in late 2017. The project is the first development in the City of Miami to be funded in part by EB-5 visas. While the entire site was technically addressed 1101 Brickell Avenue, the building is actually located on the back of the lot, behind two existing office buildings, at 1100 Brickell Bay Drive. It is about two blocks from the Tenth Street Metromover station.

History
Kobi Karp provided design plans for a tower at 1101 Brickell Avenue by developer Leviev Boymelgreen. The 849-foot (259-meter) (AMSL) building was to contain  of office space,  of retail as well as 650 residences. However, the project was put on hold due to the crash of the United States housing bubble. The site of the project was purchased by veteran Miami developer Tibor Hollo of Florida East Coast Realty in 2009; the U.S. $33-million purchase price included the three-acre site and existing office buildings, built in 1964 and 1985. The office buildings had very low occupancy at this time, around 30% in 2010. The building was renovated and by the end of 2012 occupancy was up to 85%. In 2011, Florida International University opened a downtown campus in the building known as FIU Downtown on Brickell; they also got the signage rights to the building. In addition to the renovation, a small glass and steel addition adjacent to Brickell Avenue was completed in 2014. Known as "The Cube", the  space uses variable-tint glass and houses a TD Bank.

Design
In 2012, Hollo began developing plans for the project, and the name "Panorama Tower" was introduced. Hollo revised the plans in 2013. In 2013 and 2014, respectively, the developers were working to ensure the building height would not be greatly reduced under the FAA's "emergency airspace" or "one-engine inoperative" policies which were proposed at that time. Moshe Cosicher is the architect of record for the project and Fons Inc. was retained to work alongside for the production and construction administration of the project. The number of hotel rooms decreased to 208, and the flag was revealed to be Hyatt full service brand Hyatt Centric. The hotel would be located within 17 floors lining the east face of the pedestal. In 2016, a slight height increase to the current  was sought by the developers and approved by the FAA.

Interior design concept was provided by Zyscovich Architecture.

Construction
Site preparation began in late 2013 with the clearing of the site and demolition of an existing parking garage, with foundation work by HJ Foundation, part of the Keller Group beginning in June 2014, when California-based Tutor Perini was awarded the US$255 million contract as the main contractor. As of January 2015 the construction was said to be ahead of schedule. The continuous concrete pour for the approximately 14,000 cubic yard raft slab required hundreds of cement trucks operating for over 24 hours from numerous factories. The approximately  pour took place over a weekend in late March 2015 and was one of the largest continuous pours in Florida history. The project received a US$340 million construction loan from Wells Fargo in 2015, with construction well underway. By October 2015, construction was up to the top of the 19-story pedestal. In January 2016, the building received a temporary certificate of occupancy (TCO) for the lower 11 floors of the parking garage. Users of the existing buildings had been using off-site parking in the interim. Over  of the project was structurally completed, and the building was still on schedule for completion in late 2017. Hotels, parking garages, and condos generally have much less floor-to-floor height than high-rise office towers. It is unclear whether the floor count will remain at 82, or increase to 85 due to the height increase. DeSimone Consulting Engineers is serving as structural engineer on the project. The firm has designed numerous supertall towers and skyscrapers worldwide, and frequently works with top architects and developers on marquee projects globally.

On March 24, 2017, the same week the building officially surpassed the height of the Four Seasons Hotel Miami, a small fire broke out on the 68th floor just before 7 pm. It was extinguished within hours, with no injuries or delay to the project's timeline. The cause was not immediately known. No work was underway when the fire broke out.

With a topping out in April, the 208-room Hyatt Centric hotel in the pedestal is expected to open in the third quarter of 2017, with the building to open by the end of the year.

Financing
In 2014, the building became the first development in the city of Miami to be accepted into the EB-5 visa program. When the application was submitted in late 2012, it was stated that this immigrant investment system could fund about 15% to 20% of the project. However, later estimates were placed lower despite high demand that was exceeding the limit of 10,000 visas per year (throughout the country).

With a very high Walk Score, Panorama Tower is in the class of apartment buildings that have seen the most increase in value over time even into a market slowdown in 2017.

See also
 List of tallest buildings in Miami
 One Bayfront Plaza
 The Towers by Foster + Partners

Notes
While under construction, the cranes are expected to temporarily surpass .

 B. ^  The project, situated in a highly dynamic market, has undergone many revisions. Additionally, online sources often conflict, use old data, or are modified from their original text. One source from 2013 quoted 128 hotel rooms.

References

External links

 Promotional website
 Video of foundation pour by Tutor Perini

2018 establishments in Florida
Hotels in Miami
Office buildings in Miami
Residential buildings completed in 2018
Residential condominiums in Miami
Residential skyscrapers in Miami